The Last Campaign of Governor Booth Gardner is a 2009 documentary film directed by Daniel Junge and produced by Just Media for HBO Films. The film follows the "last campaign" of Booth Gardner, the Governor of Washington from 1985 to 1993, to facilitate the passage of the Washington Death with Dignity Act (also called Initiative 1000), legalizing physician-assisted suicide in Washington state.

Gardner, who had been diagnosed with Parkinson's disease in 1994, faces opposition from numerous determined individuals and groups, but nonetheless spearheads a successful campaign which saw the state pass I-1000—the second such law in the United States after Oregon Measure 16—with 57.8 per cent support.

The Last Campaign was nominated for the Academy Award for Best Documentary (Short Subject) in 2009.

References

External links
The Last Campaign official website
HBO website

2009 television films
2009 films
2009 documentary films
HBO documentary films
Documentary films about suicide
Assisted suicide in the United States
Films shot in Washington (state)
Documentary films about American politics
Films directed by Daniel Junge
2000s English-language films
2000s American films